Olga Pleshkova (born 9 May 1956) is a Russian speed skater. She competed at the 1980 Winter Olympics and the 1984 Winter Olympics, representing the Soviet Union.

References

External links
 

1956 births
Living people
Russian female speed skaters
Olympic speed skaters of the Soviet Union
Speed skaters at the 1980 Winter Olympics
Speed skaters at the 1984 Winter Olympics
Sportspeople from Kirov, Kirov Oblast